The Florida education system consists of public and private schools in Florida, including the State University System of Florida (SUSF), the Florida College System (FCS), the Independent Colleges and Universities of Florida (ICUF) and other private institutions, and also secondary and primary schools as well as virtual schools.

Overview 

There are 12 public universities that comprise the State University System of Florida.  In addition the Florida College System comprises 28 public community colleges and state colleges. In 2008 the State University System had 302,513 students. Florida also has private universities, some of which comprise the Independent Colleges and Universities of Florida. In 2010, nineteen of Florida's 28 community colleges were offering four year degree programs.

The state's public primary and secondary schools are administered by the Florida Department of Education (FLDOE). FLDOE also has authority over the Florida College System.  The State University System is under the authority of the Florida Board of Governors.

As mandated by the Florida Constitution, Article IX, section 4, Florida has 67 school districts, one for each county. All are separate from municipal government. School districts tax property within their jurisdictions to support their budgets.

Florida has hundreds of private schools of all types. The FLDOE has no authority over private school operations. Private schools may or may not be accredited, and achievement tests are not required for private school graduating seniors. Many private schools obtain accreditation and perform achievement tests to show parents the school's interest in educational performance.

In 2008, about 55,000 students were homeschooled. Neither FLDOE nor the local school district has authority to regulate home school activities. The government supports and assists homeschooling activities. There is no minimum number of days in a year, or hours in a day, that must be met, and achievement tests are not required for home school graduating seniors.

Primary and secondary schools
Early attempts to develop public schools began as early as 1831, when the Florida Education Society was founded in Tallahassee. After the Civil War, the state adopted a new constitution which established the Department of Public Instruction, headed by the Superintendent of Public Instruction. The legislature passed a law in 1869 to provide "a uniform system of public instruction, free to all the youth residing in the state between the age of six and twenty-one years", and C. Thurston Chase was appointed by the governor to serve as the first superintendent. In 1968, a constitutional revision replaced the Department of Public Instruction with the Department of Education, which is headed by the Commissioner of Education.

For most of the state's history, the schools have been segregated by race. Prior to the civil war, little effort was made to educate African-American children, and in fact an 1832 law made it illegal to educate black people, whether slave or free. In 1885, the state passed a law prohibiting integrated education. In 1920 the state appointed J.H. Brinson as its first supervisor of Negro education. The state also maintained segregated schools for Seminoles.

In 1954, the Brown v. Board of Education, a United States Supreme Court case, declared segregated schools illegal, but few changes were made in Florida. Although a 1960 law repealed the prohibition on integration, it was not until 1963 that a black student, Chester Seabury, petitioned the Broward Board of Education, gained admittance, and became the first African-American to graduate from a white high school in Florida.

School districts are organized within county boundaries.  Each school district has an elected Board of education which sets policy, budget, goals and approves expenditures. Management is the responsibility of a Superintendent of schools.

The Florida Constitution allows districts to either elect the superintendent in a popular election (the default provision) or choose (via popular election) to allow the school board to appoint the superintendent.  , school boards in 25 districts (Alachua, Brevard, Broward, Charlotte, Collier, Duval, Flagler, Hernando, Hillsborough, Indian River, Lake, Lee, Manatee, Miami-Dade, Okeechobee, Orange, Osceola, Palm Beach, Pinellas, Polk, Saint Johns, Saint Lucie, Sarasota, Seminole, and Volusia) appointed the superintendent; the remaining districts elect their superintendent.

In 2008, there were 619 secondary schools in the state.

Education Week evaluated Florida's schools for 2010, fifth in the nation overall, with As for student testing, teacher accountability and progress on closing the achievement gap. It gave the state an F for per-pupil spending.

In 2011, the liberal Center for American Progress stated that for half the states it studied, it found no correlation between spending and achievement after allowing for cost of living, and students living in poverty. The Center commended Florida as one of two states that provides annual school-level productivity evaluations which report to the public how well school funds are being spent at the local level.

Florida's public-school revenue per student and spending per $1000 of personal income usually rank in the bottom 25 percent of U.S. states. Average teacher salaries rank near the middle of U.S. states.

Florida public schools have consistently ranked in the bottom 25 percent of many national surveys and average test-score rankings before allowances for race are made.  When allowance for race is considered, a 2007 US Government list of test scores shows Florida white fourth graders performed 13th in the nation for reading (232), 12th for math (250); while black fourth graders were 11th for math (225), 12th for reading (208). White eighth graders scored 30th for math (289) and 36th for reading (268). Neither score was considered statistically significant from average. Black eighth graders ranked 19th on math (259), 25th on reading (244).

In 2002, voters approved a constitutional amendment to limit class size in public schools starting in the 2010-11 school year from 18 in lower grades to 23 in high school. This was phased in by the legislature from 2003 to 2009, to promote compliance when the amendment took effect. As of March 2011, 28 school districts had failed to comply and owed fines, which were to be redistributed to districts that were in compliance.

Florida, like other states, appears to substantially undercount dropouts in reporting.

In 2007, the state's school population grew by 477 students to 2,641,598, which was far below the projected 48,376 increase. School boards blamed rising insurance and property tax costs and the major 2004 and 2005 hurricane season, which have discouraged migration into Florida. Growth in counties such as Miami-Dade, Broward, Palm Beach, Hillsborough, Orange, Pinellas, and Duval counties was under state projections. Hillsborough County was the only one of these to have grown; growth in the county was projected to be 4,537, but the actual increase was only 536 students.

Some school districts had backed up the start of the academic year well into August in order to complete the semester and exams before the December holiday break. In 2006, the legislature required districts to start no earlier than two weeks before the end of August, but that was changed in 2015 to no earlier than August 10. The state requires that each school teach for 180 days. Private schools  may be open for more than 170 days.

Florida does not handpick the best students to take the Advanced Placement exams.

In 2010, there were about 60,750 foreign-born children of illegal immigrants attending public schools. The cost per year averaged $9,035 annually. The total cost of educating these children is over $548 million.

Paddling students for discipline is legal in Florida.

History

Florida had a voucher system for low-income families from failing school districts from 1999 until 2006. In the final year, 750 students out of 190,000 eligible made this choice. The state paid an average of $4,000 per student as opposed to the $7,206 per student attending public schools.

The system was overturned by the Florida Supreme Court for violating separation of church and state, since some students used these for church schools.

Between 2000 and 2008, school enrollment increased 6%,  the number of teachers 20%.

For 2012, StudentsFirst, a political lobbying organization, ranked Florida second among the fifty states, for policy related to education reform.

Sports
As in most areas, high schools compete in sports in two types of division. One, because of logistical and geographical constraints, is necessarily local. That is, large schools play small ones in the same area. A second division is based on school population and is statewide. Eventually, schools with the best records in this type of division will meet each other for seasonal playoffs to determine the state champion.

Competition is under the auspices of the Florida High School Athletic Association.

Funding
In the fiscal year 2007-2008, the Florida Educational Enhancement Trust Fund received $1.28 billion from the Florida Lottery, passing the billion-dollar mark for the 6th time in the lottery's 20-year history. , the current lottery's total contribution since start-up is more than $19 billion.

School choice 

Florida is a leader in providing school choice to K12 students and their families. It provides various programs allowing students to enroll in schools outside their local school district, including other public schools, private schools, home schooling and charter schools.

Public colleges and universities
In 2010, the annual tuition alone, at Florida's 12 public universities was $4,886, third lowest in the country. The average cost total for books, tuition, fees, and living expenses, is $15,500 compared to $16,140 average for the country.

In an attempt to save money, entering students may take nationally standardized Advanced Placement exams. In 2010, 67, 741 Florida seniors took the exam. 33,712 scored 3 or more, sufficient for advanced placement. A total of 307,000 Florida students took AP exams in 2010. 64,000 scored a minimum of three or more; 43,000 scoring a four or higher.

State University System of Florida
The State University System of Florida manages and funds Florida's twelve public universities and a public Liberal Arts college:

In 2009, the system employed 45,000 people statewide. The budget was $4.1 billion for community colleges and universities.

In 2000, the governor and the state legislature abolished the Florida Board of Regents, which long had governed the State University System of Florida, and created boards of trustees to govern each university. As is typical of executive-appointed government boards, the appointees so far have predominantly belonged to the governor's party. This effect has not been without controversy. In 2002, former governor and then-U.S. Senator Bob Graham (Dem.) led a constitutional-amendment ballot referendum designed to restore the board-of-regents system. Voters approved. Therefore, the legislature created the Florida Board of Governors; however, each university still maintains a Board of Trustees which work under the Board of Governors. During Florida's 2007 legislative session, Governor Charlie Crist signed into law SB-1710, which allowed the Board of Governors to allow a tuition differential for the University of Florida, Florida State University, and the University of South Florida.  This legislation ultimately created a tier system for higher education in Florida's State University System.

Florida College System
The Florida College System manages and funds Florida's 28 public community colleges and state colleges, with over 100 locations throughout the state of Florida.

Private colleges and universities
The Independent Colleges and Universities of Florida is an association of around 30 private, educational institutions in the state of Florida. The association reported that their member institutions enrolled over 121,000 students in the fall of 2006.

 Adventist University of Health Sciences, Orlando
 American David Livingstone University of Florida (Miami)
 Ave Maria University, Ave Maria
 Barry University, Miami Shores
 Beacon College, Leesburg
 Bethune-Cookman University, Daytona Beach
 Clearwater Christian College, Clearwater
 Eckerd College, St. Petersburg
 Edward Waters College, Jacksonville
 Embry-Riddle Aeronautical University, Daytona Beach
 Everglades University
 Flagler College, Saint Augustine
 Florida Coastal School of Law, Jacksonville
 Florida College, Tampa
 Florida Institute of Technology, Melbourne
 Florida Memorial University, Miami
 Florida Southern College, Lakeland
 Gordon-Conwell Theological Seminary (Jacksonville, Florida)
 Hodges University, Naples
 Jacksonville University, Jacksonville
 Keiser University, multiple locations
 Lynn University, Boca Raton
 Nova Southeastern University, Fort Lauderdale
 Palm Beach Atlantic University, West Palm Beach
 Pensacola Christian College (Pensacola)
 Reformed Theological Seminary (Orlando)
 Ringling College of Art and Design, Sarasota
 Rollins College, Orlando
 Saint Leo University, Saint Leo
 Saint Thomas University, Miami
 Southeastern University, Lakeland
 Stetson University, DeLand
 University of Miami, Coral Gables
 University of Tampa, Tampa
 Warner University, Lake Wales
 Webber International University, Babson Park
 Yeshiva V'Kollel Beis Moshe Chaim

Additionally, there are many colleges and universities that are not affiliated with the ICUF.

 Baptist College of Florida
 Boca Raton Arts College
 Carlos Albizu University
 Everest University
 Johnson University Florida
 Fort Lauderdale Institute of Art
 The Art Institute of Jacksonville, Jacksonville
 Florida National University
 Full Sail University
 Hindu University of America (Orlando)
 Hobe Sound College
 Johnson & Wales University
 Jones College
 Miami International University
 Orlando Culinary Academy
 Pensacola Christian College
 Rasmussen College
 Saint John's College
 Schiller International University
 Talmudic University of Florida (Miami Beach)
 Yeshiva Gedolah Rabbinical College - Lubavitch (Miami Beach)
 Touro College South (Miami Beach)
 Trinity Baptist College, Jacksonville
 Trinity College, New Port Richey

See also

Florida College System
Florida Board of Governors
Florida Department of Education
State University System of Florida
List of colleges and universities in Florida
 Corporal punishment in Florida

References

External links